Karthigai Deepam is a 2022 Indian Tamil-language television series airing on Zee Tamil. It stars Karthik Raj (after a break from Sembaruthi) and Arthika in the lead roles. It premiered on 5 December 2022 and directed by V. Sathasivam. The series is an official remake of Zee Bangla's drama Krishnakoli. 

The story is about Deepa, a dark-skinned girl, who sets out to remove stigma attached to colour. She marries Karthikeyan and faces discrimination due to her complexion.

Plot
The story revolves around Deepa is a young, dusky girl, who faces discrimination because of her skin color. However, she is talented and sets out on a journey, to create an identity for herself. She believes that her complexion is akin to Lord Kartikeyan's complexion. Her life changes after marriage when she goes on to make a career in music. Deepa changes her life drastically.

Cast

Main
 Karthik Raj as Karthikeyan Arunachalam (Karthik)
 Arthika as Deepa

Recurring 
 Rajesh as Dharmalingam: Deepa's father; Janaki's husband
 Tamil Selvi as Janaki: Deepa's mother; Dharmalingam's wife
 Meera Krishna as Abhirami Nachiyaar Arunachalam: Karthik, Anand and Arun's mother; Meenakshi and Aishwarys's mother-in-law; Arunachalam's wife
 Madhu Mohan as Arunachalam: Karthik, Anand and Arun's father; Meenakshi and Aishwarys's father-in-law; Abhirami's husband
 Vichithra as Rajashree: A village president
 Janani Deva as Roopashree: Rajashree's daughter
 Riya Choudhary as Meenakshi: Anand's wife; Abhirami and Arunachalam's first daughter-in-law; Karthik's first sister-in-law
 Nimesh Sagar as Anand Arunachalam: Abhirami and Arunachalam's first son; Arun and Karthik's elder brother; Meenakshi's husband
 Vandhana Michael / Shubha Raksha as Aishwarya (Aishu): Arun's wife; Abhirami and Arunachalam's second daughter-in-law; Karthik's second sister-in-law
 Ayub VJ as Arun Arunachalam: Abhirami and Arunachalam's second son; Aishwarya's husband
 Reshmaa as Dharmalingam's daughter-in-law 
 Sathya Sudha as Dharmalingam's son
 Sri Varshan Chinraj as Dharmalingam's son
 Dinesh Gopalsamy as Shiva: Abhirami's Arch Rival who vows to avenge his sister's death
 Smriti Kashyap as Nakshathra
 "Adhu Idhu Edhu" Diwakar as Narayanan: Shiva's sidekick

Special appearances
 Vijayakumar 
 Nanda Gopal
 Senthilnathan
 Jayanthi Narayanan
 Chandini Prakash as Nikitha

Production

Development
Zee Bangla's fiction Krishnakoli was remade on Zee Telugu on 2021 the title name as Krishna Tulasi.

Casting
Initially, Roshini Haripriyan was chosen and approached to play the female lead but she declined. Karthik Raj was selected to play the role of smart businessman Karthikeyan, making his comeback to Tamil Television after Sembaruthi nearly two years.  Later, Aarthika was ultimately cast as Deepa. Vichithra as selected to play the negative lead and making her presence in the Tamil television after one year.  Rajesh plays a father role of Deepa, Meera Krishna plays a mother role of Karthikeyan. Besides Dinesh Gopalsamy and Tamilselvi were cast then.

Adaptations

References

External links
 Karthigai Deepam at ZEE5

Zee Tamil original programming
Tamil-language television soap operas
Television shows set in Tamil Nadu
Tamil-language romance television series
Tamil-language melodrama television series
2022 Tamil-language television series debuts
Tamil-language television series based on Bengali-languages television series
Tamil-language musical television series
Tamil-language television shows